Nathanael Wilson (died 3 November 1695) was a 17th-century English Anglican priest in Ireland.

Wilson was educated at Magdalen Hall, Oxford. He was Chaplain to James Butler, 1st Duke of Ormonde, Lord Lieutenant of Ireland before being appointed  Dean of Raphoe in 1684. He was Bishop of Limerick, Ardfert and Aghadoe from 1692 until his death on 3 November 1695.

References

17th-century Anglican bishops in Ireland
Bishops of Limerick, Ardfert and Aghadoe
1695 deaths
Alumni of Magdalen Hall, Oxford
Deans of Raphoe